The 2009 Aegon Trophy was a professional tennis tournament played on outdoor grass courts. It was part of the 2009 ATP Challenger Tour. It took place in Nottingham, Great Britain between 1 and 7 June 2009.

ATP entrants

Seeds

Rankings are as of May 25, 2009.

Other entrants
The following players received wildcards into the singles main draw:
  Daniel Cox
  Chris Eaton
  Daniel Evans
  Colin Fleming

The following players received entry from the qualifying draw:
  Rohan Bopanna
  Grigor Dimitrov (as a Lucky loser)
  Joshua Goodall
  Samuel Groth
  Tatsuma Ito

Champions

Singles

 Brendan Evans def.  Ilija Bozoljac, 6–7(4), 6–4, 7–6(4)

Doubles

 Eric Butorac /  Scott Lipsky def.  Colin Fleming /  Ken Skupski, 6–4, 6–4

References
Official website
ITF Search 
2009 Draws

Aegon Trophy
2009 in English tennis
Aegon Trophy